Road to Paradise is a 1930 American pre-Code drama film produced and distributed by First National Pictures, and starring Loretta Young, Jack Mulhall and Raymond Hatton. It was directed by William Beaudine and is based on a 1920 play Dodson Mitchell by Zelda Sears called Cornered. The film was a remake of a 1924 silent version, entitled Cornered, which was also directed by William Beaudine.

Plot
Loretta Young plays the part of an orphan named Mary Brennan, who has been raised by two thieves (Raymond Hatton and George Barraud) and does not know that she has a twin sister who is now a wealthy socialite (Loretta Young as Margaret Waring). One day, while she is  dining at a Chinese restaurant with her two guardians, they notice the wealthy socialite and are taken aback at how closely she resembles Brennan. Hatton and Barraud convince Brennan that she should impersonate the socialite so that they can enter her house and steal the contents of her safe. Brennan enters the house and meet Jack Mulhall who senses something different about Waring and immediately falls in love with her. When night falls, Brennan lets Hatton and Barraud into the house and they attempt to open the safe. Waring happens to enter the house and is shocked to find a woman that looks like her. She is shot at by Barraud, Brennan stays behind to care for Waring but tricks the police into thinking that Waring is the imposter and thief. Even though Mulhall knows the truth, he keeps quiet because he is in love with her. Eventually Brennan discovers that Waring is her twin sister when they discover that they have matching lockets, the charges are dropped and Brennan accepts Mulhall's proposal of marriage.

Cast

Preservation status
The film survives intact has been shown on television and cable. Road to Paradise has been preserved at the Library of Congress.

Home media
The film is available on DVD from the Warner Archive Collection as a double bill with another Loretta Young film Week-End Marriage.

References

External links
 Road to Paradise at IMDb.com
 Road to Pardise at  TCM
 allmovie/synopsis; Road to Paradise

1930 films
American films based on plays
First National Pictures films
1930 drama films
American drama films
American black-and-white films
Warner Bros. films
Films directed by William Beaudine
1930s English-language films
Films with screenplays by F. Hugh Herbert
1930s American films